The following is a list of Special Areas of Conservation in Cornwall

 Breney Common and Goss and Tregoss Moors
 Carrine Common
 Crowdy Marsh
 Fal and Helford
 Godrevy Head to St Agnes
 Isles of Scilly Complex
 Lower Bostraze and Leswidden
 Newlyn Downs
 Penhale Dunes
 Phoenix United Mine and Crow's Nest
 Plymouth Sound and Estuaries
 Polruan to Polperro
 River Camel
 St Austell Clay Pits
 The Lizard
 Tintagel-Marsland-Clovelly Coast (see Tintagel, Marsland Valley, Clovelly)
 Tregonning Hill

See also

 List of Sites of Special Scientific Interest in Cornwall

External links
  JNCC list of UK Special Areas of Conservation

Special Areas of Conservation